Jennifer Altermatt (born 5 May 1960) is an Australian alpine skier. She competed in two events at the 1980 Winter Olympics.

References

External links
 

1960 births
Living people
Australian female alpine skiers
Olympic alpine skiers of Australia
Alpine skiers at the 1980 Winter Olympics